The Big Party is a 1930 American pre-Code comedy film directed by John G. Blystone and written by Harlan Thompson. The film stars Sue Carol, Dixie Lee, Walter Catlett, Frank Albertson, Richard Keene, and Douglas Gilmore. The film was released on February 23, 1930, by Fox Film Corporation. It is a lost film.

Cast
Sue Carol as Flo Jenkins
Dixie Lee as Kitty Collins
Walter Catlett as Mr. Goldfarb
Frank Albertson as Jack Hunter
Richard Keene as Eddie Perkins
Douglas Gilmore as Allen Weatherby		
Elizabeth Patterson as Mrs. Goldfarb
Charles Judels as Dupuy (uncredited)
Whispering Jack Smith as Billy Greer (uncredited)

Reception
The Film Daily reviewed the film in April 1930 calling it a "Can't Miss" and predicted excellent box office traffic. The film also received a favorable review from the National Board of Review in March 1930. When reviewing the film in April 1930, Photoplay considered Dixie Lee's performance to be one of the best in film for 1930.

References

External links

1930 films
1930s English-language films
Fox Film films
American comedy films
1930 comedy films
Films directed by John G. Blystone
American black-and-white films
1930 lost films
Lost comedy films
1930s American films